Rhee Millena Timbang is the current and 13th Obispo Máximo or Supreme Bishop of the Philippine Independent Church (Iglesia Filipina Independiente). He was elevated from Bishop of Surigao to Obispo Máximo on June 25, 2017 and replaced Ephraim Fajutagana after getting elected on May 9, 2017. He is the first supreme bishop from Mindanao. He was also previously the Chairperson of the Supreme Council of Bishops.

In his role as Obispo Máximo, Timbang has been highly critical of then-Philippine president Rodrigo Duterte's declaration of martial law in Mindanao and has condemned those who would link him and his church with the ongoing communist rebellion in the Philippines.

In 2021, during the Philippine Independent Church's 119th Proclamation Anniversary and as part of celebrating 500 years of Christianity in the Philippines, Timbang led the signatories of the representatives of the Philippine Independent Church (IFI) in the signing of two joint statements with the Roman Catholic Church (RCC), represented by the officials of the Catholic Bishops' Conference of the Philippines, expressing both Church's readiness for a more ecumenical cooperation amidst diversity. The first statement was titled "Celebrating the Gift of Faith, Learning from the Past, and Journeying Together" and the second one as "Mutual Recognition of Baptisms between the IFI and the RCC in the Philippines." In one of the statements, both IFI and Catholic leaders "ask and pray for mutual forgiveness for any injuries inflicted in the past" and "strive for the healing and purification of memories among its members".

References

External links
The Obispo Maximo – Official website of the Iglesia Filipina Independiente

Filipino Christian religious leaders
Filipino bishops
Living people
Members of the Philippine Independent Church
Bishops of Independent Catholic denominations
Anglo-Catholic bishops
Anglo-Catholic clergy
People from Surigao City
Year of birth missing (living people)